James B. and Diana M. Dyer House is a historic home located at Winston-Salem, Forsyth County, North Carolina.  It was built in 1931, and is a large one- and two-story, irregularly-massed, Tudor Revival style dwelling with a rough-cut-stone exterior. It has a green slate roof, stepped stone chimney, and metal casement windows.  It was built for James Dyer, a top executive at R. J. Reynolds Tobacco Company.

It was listed on the National Register of Historic Places in 2006.

References

Houses on the National Register of Historic Places in North Carolina
Tudor Revival architecture in North Carolina
Houses completed in 1931
Houses in Winston-Salem, North Carolina
National Register of Historic Places in Winston-Salem, North Carolina